Burgschleinitz-Kühnring is a market town in the district of Horn in Lower Austria, Austria.

Geography
The municipal area is part of the historic Waldviertel region, stretching along extended forests on the northeastern rim of the Manhartsberg ridge. It comprises the cadastral communities of Amelsdorf, Burgschleinitz, Buttendorf, Geiersdorf, Harmannsdorf, Kühnring, Matzelsdorf, Reinprechtspölla, Sachsendorf, Sonndorf, and Zogelsdorf.

History
About 1130 Hadmar I of Kuenring, a ministerialis in the service of the Babenberg margrave Leopold III of Austria had a fortress erected at the site of the present-day Kühnring parish church. According to tradition, his ancestors had already erected a chapel here, which was consecrated by Bishop Altmann of Passau in 1083.

In 1612 a Baroque castle was erected in the nearby village of Harmannsdorf, which became known as the residence of Nobel laureate Bertha von Suttner (1843–1914). Here she wrote large parts of her novel Die Waffen nieder! (Lay Down Your Arms!), published in 1889.

Population

Politics
Seats in the municipal council (Gemeinderat) as of 2015 local elections:
Austrian People's Party (ÖVP): 15
Social Democratic Party of Austria (SPÖ): 2
The Greens – The Green Alternative: 2

Notable people
Otto Zykan (1935–2006), composer, died in Sachsendorf

References

Cities and towns in Horn District